A parmularius was any of the various types of gladiator who used a small shield called a parma. Due to having a small shield parmularii would wear shin armour (ocreae) on both shins. This armour would be larger than the single ocrea worn on the right shin by a scutarius who carried a larger shield. Scutarii and parmularii are mentioned by Marcus Aurelius in his Meditations as two factions at the gladiator fights.

See also
 List of Roman gladiator types
Thraex

References

Gladiator types